Jonathan Haagensen Cerqueira (born February 23, 1983) is a Brazilian actor, model, and singer.

Life and career
A resident of the Vidigal community since his birth, he has Norwegian ancestry from his father, who has not seen since he was six years old. "I never knew anything about my father. I only know that he lives in Vitória, the capital city of the state of Espírito Santo," he says.

Haagensen appeared in the film City of God, by Fernando Meireles and Kátia Lund, as did his brother, Phellipe Haagensen, also an actor. He was discovered in the Vidigal's theatrical company Nós do Morro.

He has participated, as a model, in the Fashion Rio event, campaigning for Dolce & Gabbana and worked in promotional events for the NBA. He participated in the reality show A Fazenda, from TV Record.

Haagensen portrayed Dodo in Da Cor do Pecado and Cláudio in Paraíso Tropical.

He is also member of the hip hop music group Melanina Carioca composed of members of "Nós do Morro".

Filmography (partial)
The director's name is listed in parenthesis.
 2000 - Palace II - Short - (Fernando Meirelles and Kátia Lund)
 2002 - City of God (Cidade de Deus) - (Fernando Meirelles and Kátia Lund)
 2002 - Seja o que Deus Quiser - (Murilo Salles)
 2004 - Four for None (O Diabo a Quatro) - (Alice de Andrade)
 2002/05 - City of Men (Cidade dos Homens) - TV series - (Fernando Meirelles, Kátia Lund, Paulo Morelli, Cao Hamburger and others)
 2006 - The Samba Poet (Noel - Poeta da Vila) - (Ricardo Van Steen)
 2007 - City of Men (Cidade dos Homens) - (Paulo Morelli)
 2008 - Embarque Imediato - (Allan Fiterman)
 2018 - O Mecanismo - (José Padilha)
 2020 - Omniscient

Discography
Melanina Carioca (Haagensen is part of the hip hop group, including actors Marcello Melo Jr. and Roberta Rodrigues.)

References

External links

Adoro cinema brasileiro (pt)
IstoÉ Gente on-line Magazine (pt)
bNet

1983 births
Living people
Male actors from Rio de Janeiro (city)
Afro-Brazilian male actors
Brazilian people of Norwegian descent
Brazilian male television actors
Brazilian male film actors
Brazilian male models
21st-century Brazilian male singers
21st-century Brazilian singers
The Farm (TV series) contestants